Jean Paul "J. P." Izquierdo (born March 12, 1969) is a former Canadian football slotback who played seven seasons in the Canadian Football League (CFL) with the Toronto Argonauts, Edmonton Eskimos and Calgary Stampeders. He was drafted by the Toronto Argonauts in the second round of the 1991 CFL Draft. He played CIS football at the University of Calgary and attended Saint Francis High School in Calgary, Alberta. He is the older brother of former CFL player Javier Glatt.

College career
Izquierdo played CIS football for the Calgary Dinos, setting the school record for total touchdowns with 29. He also recorded 2,505 rushing yards on 434 attempts. He helped the Dinos win the 24th Vanier Cup in 1988, was a first team All-Canadian in 1989 and was on the second national all-star team in 1990.

Professional career
Izquierdo was selected by the Toronto Argonauts with the tenth pick in the 1991 CFL Draft. He played for the Argonauts from 1991 to 1992, winning the 79th Grey Cup in 1991. He played for the Edmonton Eskimos from 1993 to 1995, winning the 81st Grey Cup in 1993. Izquierdo played for the Argonauts in 1996, winning the 84th Grey Cup. He played for the Calgary Stampeders in 1997.

Personal life
Izquierdo later became a teacher at his alma mater Saint Francis High School.

References

External links
Just Sports Stats

Living people
1969 births
Players of Canadian football from Alberta
Canadian football slotbacks
Calgary Dinos football players
Toronto Argonauts players
Edmonton Elks players
Calgary Stampeders players
Canadian schoolteachers
Canadian football people from Calgary